The 2018 Camellia Bowl was a college football bowl game played on December 15, 2018, with kickoff scheduled for 5:30 p.m. EST (4:30 p.m. local CST). It was the fifth edition of the Camellia Bowl, and one of the 2018–19 bowl games concluding the 2018 FBS football season. Sponsored by broadcasting company Raycom Media, the game was officially known as the Raycom Media Camellia Bowl.

Teams
The game featured the Eastern Michigan Eagles from the Mid-American Conference (MAC) and the Georgia Southern Eagles of the Sun Belt Conference. This was the first meeting between the two programs.

Georgia Southern Eagles

On November 28, Georgia-based news organizations reported that Georgia Southern would play in the Camellia Bowl, which was confirmed via an official announcement on December 2. They entered the bowl with a 9–3 record (6–2 in conference). The Eagles had previously played in one bowl game, winning the 2015 GoDaddy Bowl over Bowling Green; before 2014, the team competed in the Football Championship Subdivision (formerly known as Division I-AA).

Eastern Michigan Eagles

Eastern Michigan received and accepted a bid to the Camellia Bowl on December 2. The Eagles entered the bowl with a 7–5 record (5–3 in conference). This was the Eagles' second bowl game in the last three years, having also played in the 2016 Bahamas Bowl where they were defeated by Old Dominion, 24–20.

Game summary

Scoring summary

Statistics

References

External links

Box score at ESPN
Game statistics at camelliabowl.com

Camellia Bowl
Camellia Bowl
Camellia Bowl
Camellia Bowl
Eastern Michigan Eagles football bowl games
Georgia Southern Eagles football bowl games